The following radio stations broadcast on AM frequency 1630 kHz: 1630 AM is a Regional broadcast frequency.

Argentina
 LRM991 AMérica in San José
 Restauración in Hurlingham, Buenos Aires.

Mexico
 XESCAH-AM in Tarímbaro, Michoacán de Ocampo
 XEUT-AM in Tijuana, Baja California

United States
All stations operate with 10 kW during the daytime and 1 kW at nighttime and are Class B stations.

External links
 Radio Locator list of stations on 1630

References

Lists of radio stations by frequency